Armin Falk (born 18 January 1968) is a German economist. He has held a chair at the University of Bonn since 2003.

Biography

Education and career
Falk studied economics as well as philosophy and history at the University of Cologne. In 1998 he obtained a Ph.D. from the University of Zurich under the supervision of Ernst Fehr.

Falk is Professor of Economics and Director of the Behavior and Inequality Research Institute (briq), as well as the Laboratory of Experimental Economics at the University of Bonn. He is external scientific member of the Max Planck Society (and as such a member of the Max Planck Institute for Research on Collective Goods), program director at the Institute for the Study of Labor (IZA), fellow of the Centre for Economic Policy Research (CEPR), fellow of the Center for Economic Studies (CESifo), Research Professor at the German Institute for Economic Research (DIW), and member of the scientific council of the Federal Ministry of Economics and Technology. Furthermore, he is affiliated with the Institute for New Economic Thinking.

Research
Falk's research interests include microeconomics, behavioral economics, and neuroeconomics. He has published in renowned journals like the American Economic Review, Quarterly Journal of Economics, Econometrica, and Science. In the German Handelsblatt ranking of 2010, which analyzes current research output of economists in Germany, Austria, and German speaking Switzerland in terms of quality of publications since 2005, Falk reached the 8th place.

In a broad sense, Falk's research is about obtaining a better empirical foundation of economic behavior. While the traditional economic model of individual behavior postulates perfect rationality and egoism (homo oeconomicus), the work of Falk demonstrates that human behavior is better described by bounded rationality. In addition, Falk shows that social preferences such as fairness and trust are important determinants of behavior.

His research is highly interdisciplinary and builds on insights from experimental research, social psychology, genetics, and neuroscience. In terms of methods, Falk mainly uses experiments, both in the lab and in the field, complemented by neuroscientific methods, e.g., functional magnetic resonance imaging. An additional focus is the analysis of representative survey data.

The research of Falk can broadly be divided into two main areas, the analysis of economic preferences and psychological aspects of the labor market. A better understanding of preferences and personality is of great importance for economic and social science, as virtually every model in that area needs to make assumptions on individual behavior. A key focus has been the analysis of social preferences, as well risk and time preferences, but also personality. Supported by an ERC Starting Grant, Falk studies the distribution of preferences in the population as well as socioeconomic determinants of preferences.

A second important focus of Falk's research has been the analysis of psychological aspects in labor markets (Behavioral Labor Economics). This line of research demonstrates that in particular in labor market contexts, motives such as social preferences, social comparison, trust, social approval, and intrinsic motivation play an important role. This has implications for work relations, as well as the functioning of organizations and labor markets.

Allegations of abusive behavior

In a series of videos posted on social networks, Falk was accused of harassment by his co-author Nora Szech over a period of 12 years. Falk's employer, the Institute on Behavior & Inequality (briq) at the University of Bonn made a public statement saying an independent investigation was launched to investigate the allegations. Several high-profile economists questioned the independence of such investigation, given the wording of the press release and the fact that Falk is one of the two CEOs of Institute on Behavior & Inequality. Professor Andreas Peichl, an elected member of the German Economic Association, announced that the Association was also looking into the allegations of Falk's misconduct.

Awards and honors
 2021 Fellow of the Econometric Society
 2013 European Research Council (ERC) "Advanced Grant". 
 2011 Award of the Berlin-Brandenburg Academy of Sciences and Humanities
 2011 Yrjö Jahnsson Award (the chair of the award committee was his PhD supervisor, Ernst Fehr)
 2010 European Academy of Sciences and Arts
 2009 German Academy of Sciences Leopoldina
 2009 North Rhine-Westphalian Academy of Sciences, Humanities and the Arts
 2009 Gottfried Wilhelm Leibniz Prize of the Deutschen Forschungsgemeinschaft
 2008 Gossen Prize of the Verein für Socialpolitik
 2007 Fellow of the European Economic Association
 2006 John T. Dunlop Outstanding Scholar Award of the Labor and Employment Relations Association
 2004 “CESifo Prize in Public Economics”

Selected publications
 
 
 
 .
 .
 .

References

External links
 
 Armin Falk on the website of the Center for Economics and Neuroscience at the University of Bonn (with Curriculum Vitae)

1968 births
Living people
Neuroeconomists
University of Cologne alumni
Academic staff of the University of Bonn
Gottfried Wilhelm Leibniz Prize winners
University of Zurich alumni
Behavioral economists
20th-century  German economists
21st-century  German  economists
Fellows of the European Economic Association
Fellows of the Econometric Society